Mélodie passagère – Alice canta Satie, Fauré & Ravel is the tenth studio album by Italian singer-songwriter Alice, released in 1988 on EMI Music.

After the commercial success of the pop albums Park Hotel  (1986) and Elisir (1987) the singer changed musical direction and set out on a tour in Italy and Switzerland performing works by fin de siècle composers Erik Satie, Gabriel Fauré and Maurice Ravel in classical auditoriums and concert halls, accompanied by pianist Michele Fedrigotti. The programme which saw Alice mainly performing lyrics in French but also Aramaic ("Kaddish") and Latin ("Pie Jesu") was entitled Mélodie Passagére which translates as Fleeting Melody or Passing Melody and was later recorded in the studio and released by EMI that same year.

Track listing

Side A
"Les Anges" (Erik Satie) – 1:40
"Sylvie" (Satie) – 1:58
"Élégie" (Satie) – 1:43
"Chanson D'Amour" (Gabriel Fauré) – 2:32
"Barcarolle" (Fauré) – 1:40
"Après Un Rêve (Fauré) – 1:39
"Adieu" (Fauré) – 1:58
"Gnossienne Nr. 4" (instrumental) (Satie) – 2:39
"Air Du Poète" (Satie) – 0:48
"Spleen" (Satie) – 0:40
"Daphénéo" (Satie) – 1:10
"Air Du Rat" (Satie) – 0:40
"Chanson Médiévale" (Satie) – 1:25
"Chanson" (Satie) – 1:10

Side B
"Kaddish" (Maurice Ravel) – 4:03
"Gnossienne Nr. 1" (instrumental) (Satie) – 3:49
"Hymne" (Satie) – 4:39
"Pie Jesu" (Fauré) – 4:19

Personnel
 Alice – vocals, keyboards 
 Michele Fedrigotti – piano, keyboards

Production
 Francesco Messina – record producer
 Tim Kramer – recording and mix at Logic Studio, Milan
 Marco Guarnerio – musical collaboration
 "Brian" Pino Pischetola – digital editing, AMS Audio File, Logic Studio 
 Polystudio – artistic direction 
 Fulvio Ventura – photography

External links

1988 albums
Alice (singer) albums
EMI Records albums
French-language albums